Indian philosophy, the systems of thought and reflection that were developed by the civilizations of the Indian subcontinent. They include both orthodox (astika) systems, namely, the Nyaya, Vaisheshika, Samkhya, Yoga, Purva-Mimamsa (or Mimamsa), and Vedanta (Advaita, Dwaita, Bhedbheda, Vishistadvaita), and unorthodox (nastika) systems, such as Buddhism, Jainism, Ajivika, Ajnana, Charvaka etc. as well as other schools such as Raseswera, Paninya, Pratyabhijna, Pasupata Shaivism, Shaivism etc. Indian thought has been concerned with various philosophical problems, significant among which are the nature of the world (cosmology), the nature of reality (metaphysics), logic, the nature of knowledge (epistemology), ethics, and the philosophy of religion etc. Some of the most famous and influential philosophers of all time were from the Indian Subcontinent such as Buddha, Nagarjuna, Adi Sankara, etc. This list is until 14th century AD.

See also 

 Hindu Philosophy
 Buddhist Philosophy
 Jain philosophy
Indian Philosophers
Karma
Samsara
Moksha
Artha

References 

Lists of Indian people by occupation
Lists of philosophers

Indian philosophers by century